2016 Chinese FA Women's Super Cup (Chinese: 2016中国足球协会女子超级杯) was the 15th Chinese FA Women's Super Cup, an annual football match contested by the winners of Chinese Women's Super League and Chinese Women's Football Championship competitions. The match was played at Huizhou Olympic Stadium on 12 November 2016, and contested by 2016 Chinese Women's Super League winners Dalian Quanjian and 2016 Chinese Women's Football Championship winners Tianjin Huisen. Tianjin Huisen won the match in the penalty shoot-out.

Match

Details

References 

FA Women's Super Cup
2016